Chubby Creek may refer to:

Chubby Creek (Gum Creek tributary), a creek in Itawamba County, Mississippi
Chubby Creek (Wolf River tributary), a creek in Benton County, Mississippi